Southern Sons was an Australian rock band, formed in Melbourne, Victoria in 1989 by members of The State along with lead vocalist and guitarist Irwin Thomas, who was then using the stage name Jack Jones. They are best known for their Australian top ten hits "Heart in Danger", "Hold Me in Your Arms", and "You Were There".

Career

1989–1991: Beginnings and Southern Sons

Southern Sons were established in 1989 after the members of the group The State joined New York-born, Melbourne-raised, 19-year-old guitar prodigy Jack Jones. The group signed a record deal by Glenn Wheatley on his labelWheatley Records.

In July 1990, Southern Sons released their debut single "Heart in Danger", which peaked at number 5 on the ARIA Charts. In November 1990, the single "Always and Ever" was released as well as the group's debut self-titled album, Southern Sons peaked at number 5 on the ARIA albums chart. "Hold Me in Your Arms" was released in March 1991 and peaked at number 9.

1992–1996: Nothing But the Truth and Zone

In August 1992, Southern Sons released "Lead Me to Water", the lead single from the group's second studio album. The song peaked at number 36. Nothing But the Truth, was released in November 1992 and came with the departure of guitarist Peter Bowman. The album's third single "You Were There" peaked at number 6 in May 1993. The Sydney Dance Company included three Southern Sons songs in its 1993 production of Beauty and the Beast.

Southern Sons' third and final studio album, Zone, was released in 1996. The album's lead single, "Don't Tell Me What's Right", featured vocals from Men at Work's Colin Hay.
The band split up in 1996.

1996–2018: After Southern Sons

Jones was married to New Zealand-born Australian actress Rebecca Gibney from 1992–1995. The marriage ended in divorce. He reverted to his birth name of Irwin Thomas some years ago, and has recorded under that name with a new band. He also was in a band with INXS member Gary Beers called Mudhead, which released one album. In 1999 Jones played with John Farnham on his I Can't Believe He's 50 Tour and the Tour of Duty Concert for peacekeeping Australian troops in Dili, East Timor. From 2004 until 2011, he was involved with Melbourne band Electric Mary, releasing new music independently. He left Electric Mary in 2011 and relocated to New York City.

Jones and Virgil Donati were part of Tina Arena's backing band for her In Deep tour.

Donati is currently living and working in Los Angeles, running clinics and recording with a variety of artists including Steve Vai. He was a member of U.S. rock band Soul Sirkus in 2005. He also formed progressive metal/jazz fusion band Planet X in 2000 as well as touring with Allan Holdsworth since 2012. He has performed on many other artists albums as a session musician.

Geoff Cain spent several years living in Spain, then returned to Australia. He is now living back in Warrnambool with his family, and is involved in his local music scene.

Peter Bowman left the band before the release of Nothing But the Truth. Since leaving Southern Sons, Bowman has pursued songwriting and record production in the independent music sector, most notably working with Debra Byrne on her Sleeping Child album.
A reunion tour is in the works.

2019–present: Band reformation
In November 2019, the band (minus Phil Buckle) reformed to be part of the One Electric Day concert at Cockatoo Island in Sydney, along with acts like John Farnham and James Reyne. Post-COVID-19, they are expected to continue further tours in Australia.

Members
 Jack Jones – vocals, guitar
 Phil Buckle – guitar, vocals
 Peter Bowman – guitar, vocals
 Geoff Cain – bass
 Virgil Donati – drums, keyboards

Discography

Studio albums

Compilation albums

Singles and EPs

Video albums

Music videos

Other appearances

Awards and nominations

ARIA Music Awards
The ARIA Music Awards is an annual awards ceremony that recognises excellence, innovation, and achievement across all genres of Australian music. They commenced in 1987. 1927 have won three awards.

! 
|-
| rowspan="4"|1991
| "Heart in Danger"
| ARIA Award for Breakthrough Artist - Single
| 
| rowspan="4"|
|-
| Southern Sons
| ARIA Award for Breakthrough Artist - Album
| 
|-
| Ross Fraser for "Heart in Danger" by Southern Sons
| ARIA Award for Producer of the Year
| 
|-
| Doug Brady for "Always and Forever" and "Heart in Danger" by Southern Sons
| ARIA Award for Engineer of the Year
| 
|-
| rowspan="2"|1992
| "Hold Me in Your Arms"
| ARIA Award for Song of the Year
| 
| rowspan="2"|
|-
| Ross Fraser for "Hold Me in Your Arms" by Southern Sons
| ARIA Award for Producer of the Year
| 
|-

References

Australian pop rock groups
Australian soft rock music groups
Musical groups established in 1989
Musical groups disestablished in 1996
Musical groups from Melbourne